Edvinas, a cognate of the English language name Edwin, may refer to:
 Edvinas Dautartas (born 1987), swimmer
 Edvinas Gertmonas (born 1996), football player
 Edvinas Krungolcas (born 1973), modern pentathlete
 Edvinas Ramanauskas (born 1985), sprint canoer
 Edvinas Šeškus (born 1995), basketball player
 Edvinas Vaškelis (born 1996), volleyball player

Lithuanian masculine given names